This is a list of neighborhoods in Miami in Miami-Dade County, Florida, United States. Many of the city's neighborhoods have been renamed, redefined and changed since the city's founding in 1896. As such, the exact extents of some neighborhoods can differ from person to person. The following is the list of all the city's major neighborhoods, including any corresponding sub-neighborhoods within them.

Coconut Grove is an example of a neighborhood whose size and name has stayed relatively the same since its settlement in 1825. Having been settled originally as "Cocoanut Grove", its character has stayed almost intact from its early days. In contrast, other neighborhoods have undergone many name and size changes. Buena Vista was once a much larger neighborhood in the 1920s, than it is today. Buena Vista once consumed all of the Miami Design District as well as a large part of Little Haiti, Wynwood and Edgewater. Other neighborhoods, such as the Arts & Entertainment District, were previously branded as "Omni", after the Omni Mall that was located there in the 1980s and 1990s. Midtown emerged as a new neighborhood in the mid-2000s after developers created the large scale Midtown Miami development in an area traditionally known as Edgewater.

See also
List of communities in Miami-Dade County, Florida

References

External links
 City of Miami website
 Miami-Dade Map

 
Miami
Miami-related lists